The Library of the Dead is a novel written by T. L. Huchu. Huchu's third novel and first volume in the Edinburgh Night series, it was first published by Tor Books in 2021. The novel is set in a dystopian Edinburgh.

References 

Novels by Tendai Huchu
2021 Zimbabwean novels
Novels set in Edinburgh